Nadin Ercegović (born February 2, 1973) is a former tennis player that played for Yugoslavia and Croatia. Together with Gorana Matić, Maja Murić and Maja Palaveršić, she was a member of the original Croatian Fed Cup team in 1992. Her best singles result was reaching the second round of the 1994 Australian Open. She also won three ITF titles, in Melbourne, Marsa, and Mondorf-les-Bains, respectively.

ITF Circuit finals

Singles: 4 (3–1)

Doubles: 1 (0–1)

References

External links
 
 
 

1973 births
Living people
Yugoslav female tennis players
Croatian female tennis players
Sportspeople from Delft